Matt Matheny (born February 11, 1970) is an American college basketball coach who most recently served as the men's head coach at Elon University. He replaced Ernie Nestor in March 2009.

Matheny led the Phoenix to a 21-12 record in 2012-13, the most victories in a single season by the program at the Division I level and most since the 1973-74 season. Matheny helped Elon win the Southern Conference North Division title in 2013, the program's first division crown since 2006. Matheny also helped Elon to its first postseason appearance at the Division I level, as the team earned an invitation to the CollegeInsider.com Postseason Tournament (CIT) in 2013. He was a finalist for the Hugh Durham Award, which is presented annually to the nation's top mid-major coach by CollegeInsider.com. Matheny was named the 2012-13 Southern Conference Coach of the Year.

Prior to accepting the job at Elon, Matheny spent 16 seasons, beginning in 1993, as an assistant coach at Davidson College, his alma mater. In 1992, Matheny graduated from Davidson College. He attended North Iredell High School and lived in Statesville, North Carolina.

Head coaching record

References

1970 births
Living people
American men's basketball coaches
American men's basketball players
Basketball coaches from North Carolina
Basketball players from North Carolina
College men's basketball head coaches in the United States
Davidson Wildcats men's basketball coaches
Davidson Wildcats men's basketball players
Elon Phoenix men's basketball coaches
People from Shelby, North Carolina